Roman Amoyan (born 3 September 1983) is an Armenian retired Greco-Roman wrestler of Yazidi-Kurdish descent. He is an Olympic bronze medalist, three-time World Championships medalist, and two-time European Champion. Amoyan received the Honored Master of Sports of Armenia title in 2009.

Early life
Roman was born in Yerevan, Armenian SSR to Yazidi parents. He started wrestling in 1995 and became a Junior World Champion in 2001 and a Junior European Champion in 2002. He is uncle of Malkhas Amoyan.

Career
Amoyan won the Olympic bronze medal at the 2008 Summer Olympics in Beijing in the Men's Greco-Roman 55 kg. Amoyan was Armenia's first Olympic medalist in wrestling in 16 years.

He won a bronze medal in 2009 and a silver medal in 2010 at the World Wrestling Championships. Amoyan also won a gold medal in 2006 and three silver medals in 2003, 2005, and 2008 at the European Wrestling Championships.

Amoyan was a member of the Armenian Greco-Roman wrestling team at the 2010 Wrestling World Cup. The Armenian team came in third place. Amoyan personally won a gold medal.

In 2011, Amoyan was voted the Armenian Athlete of the Year. He had suffered a severe head injury early in the European Championships that year, but still bravely fought on, with a bloody wrapping on his head the whole time. Amoyan went on become a two-time European Champion despite the injury.

He failed to qualify for the 2012 Summer Olympics. Amoyan won another bronze medal at the World Championships in 2013 and another silver at the European Championships in 2016.

Personal life
Amoyan is married. His wife is a doctor. They have a daughter.

References

External links
Sports-Reference.com

1983 births
Living people
Sportspeople from Yerevan
Armenian male sport wrestlers
Olympic wrestlers of Armenia
Olympic bronze medalists for Armenia
Wrestlers at the 2008 Summer Olympics
Olympic medalists in wrestling
Medalists at the 2008 Summer Olympics
World Wrestling Championships medalists
European Games competitors for Armenia
Wrestlers at the 2015 European Games
Armenian Yazidis
European Wrestling Champions
20th-century Armenian people
21st-century Armenian people